The 1949-50 French Rugby Union Championship was contested by 48 teams divided en 8 pools, 32 teams were qualified to play the play-offs

The Championship was won by Castres that beat Racing Paris in the final.

Context 

The 1950 Five Nations Championship was won by Wales, France was classified third.

The "Coupe de France" was won by Lourdes that beat the AS Biterroise Cheminots in the final.

"Last 32" 

In bold the clubs qualified for second round.

"Last 16" 

In bold the clubs qualified for the quarter of finals.

Quarter of finals 

In bold the clubs qualified for the semifinals.

Semifinals

Final

External links
 Compte rendu finale de 1950 lnr.fr

1950
France 1950
Championship